The 2022 FIBA U16 Women's European Championship Division B is the 17th edition of the Division B of the European basketball championship for women's national under-16 teams. It is being played from 18 to 27 August 2022 in Podgorica, Montenegro.

Participating teams

  (16th place, 2019 FIBA U16 Women's European Championship Division A)

  (15th place, 2019 FIBA U16 Women's European Championship Division A)

First round
The draw of the first round was held on 15 February 2022 in Freising, Germany.

In the first round, the teams were drawn into four groups. The first two teams from each group advance to the quarterfinals; the third and fourth teams advance to the 9th–16th place playoffs; the other teams will play in the 17th–19th place classification group.

Group A

Group B

Group C

Group D

Playoffs
Competition Schedule:

Main bracket

5th place bracket

9th place bracket

13th place bracket

17–19th place Group

Final standings

References

External links
 

2022
2022–23 in European women's basketball
International youth basketball competitions hosted by Montenegro
FIBA U16
August 2022 sports events in Europe
Sports competitions in Podgorica